The 2021 Individual Speedway World Championship Grand Prix Qualification was a one off meeting called the Grand Prix Challenge held at Goričan in Croatia. The qualifying rounds were cancelled due to COVID-19 pandemic which meant that national federations were asked to nominate a rider for the final.

The three riders that qualified for the 2021 Speedway Grand Prix were Matej Žagar, Oliver Berntzon and Krzysztof Kasprzak.

Grand Prix Challenge 
22 August 2020
 Goričan

See also 
 2021 Speedway Grand Prix

References 

Speedway Grand Prix Qualification
Speedway Grand Prix Qualifications
Qualifcation